The 1994 Barber Saab Pro Series season was the tenth season of the series. All drivers used Saab powered Goodyear shod Mondiale chassis. 1994 was the final season the Saab H engine was used. Diego Guzman won the championship.

Race calendar and results

Final standings

References

Barber Dodge Pro Series
1994 in American motorsport